Cheevertown is an extinct town in Baker County, in the U.S. state of Georgia.

History
A post office called Cheevertown was established in 1882, and remained in operation until 1894. The community most likely was named after William W. Cheever, a pioneer citizen.

See also
 Ghost town
Dewsville, Georgia
Mimsville, Georgia
Constitution, Georgia

References

Geography of Baker County, Georgia
Ghost towns in Georgia (U.S. state)